Shokhrullo Abdullaev (sometimes spelled Шохрулло Aбдуллаев in Uzbek) is an Uzbek singer and actor.

Personal life 
Shokhrullo Abdullaev was born on 14 January 1993, in Tashkent. Shokhrullo graduated from American Academy of Dramatic Arts with a degree in acting / directing, as well as with a degree in law from Westminster International University in Tashkent.  He is unmarried.

Career 
Shokhrullo has had a great interest in the arts since childhood. There was no art-related person in his family whose father was an entrepreneur and his mother a pulmonologist. Family members thought Shokhrullo would take over his father's profession. He first entered Westminster International University in Tashkent. He then went to the United States and secretly entered the American Academy of Dramatic Arts. Shokhrullo is also known as an actor in addition to singing. He started his acting career at a young age and got his first big and important role in 2010 in the movie "Game within game".Due to his studies, his acting career was suspended for 7 years and then he starred in "Hamroh" in 2017 and "Istanbullik Milliarder" in 2019. The main role played by Shokhrullo as an actor is a film about the emergency landing of the plane by Captain Zarif Saidazimov on 11 September 2001. In the film 101 Flight  filmed in 2020, Shokhrullo played one of the main roles, passenger Shohrux.

Discography

Music videos

References

External links
 
 Shokhrullo AbdullaevInstagram
Shokhrullo Abdullaev Facebook

1993 births
Uzbeks
Living people
21st-century Uzbekistani male singers
Musicians from Tashkent
21st-century Uzbekistani actors
English-language singers from Uzbekistan
Folk-pop singers
American Academy of Dramatic Arts alumni
Actors from Tashkent